Kepa Bush Reserve is an ecological reserve on the Auckland isthmus in New Zealand, south of Mission Bay. It is situated near the smaller St John's Bush and is also known as the Pourewa Valley.

Geology and biodiversity 

The Kepa Bush Reserve is primarily formed by the slopes of a sandstone ridge, between Kepa Road and the Pourewa Creek. The Pourewa Creek at the south of the reserve flows westwards towards the Ōrākei Basin. The forest ecosystem of the upper ridge transitions into the mangrove ecosystem of the Pourewa Creek, something very rarely seen in the reserves of the Waitematā Harbour catchments.

The flora in Kepa Bush is diverse and the most common plants and trees include Totara, Rimu, Kanuka, and Manuka. Fauna is very common, with Tui, Pigeon, Grey warbler, Silvereye and Morepork being the most common. Tomtit and Kaka are occasional.

History
The reserve honours the memory of Te Keepa Te Rangihiwinui, a Māori military commander and ally of the government forces during the New Zealand Wars.  He is also known as Te Keepa, Major Keepa or Major Kemp. During the land wars of the 1860s he fought for government forces against Te Kooti and Titokowaru. Besides that, Kepa Bush was used by Maori pre-colonisation as a place to find food and make weapons. It was probably a strategic location to take as it had a view out into the Orakei Basin.

The land was purchased by Bishop Selwyn in 1844, as a part of the grounds of the St John's College. In 1962, the reserve was established after the Auckland City Council purchased the site.

References 

Protected areas of the Auckland Region
Nature reserves in New Zealand
Ōrākei Local Board Area
Urban forests in New Zealand
1962 establishments in New Zealand